Be Positive is a South Korean web series starring Do Kyung-soo, Chae Seo-jin and Lee David. The web drama is produced by Samsung, and intends to send a message of support to the younger generation. The drama was aired on October 31, 2016 at 17:00 (KST). The web drama started airing on JTBC2 starting March 1, 2017.

Plot 
A story about Hwan-dong (Do Kyung-soo), a film major who is preparing for his graduation project as a movie director. His script wins a grand prize, but he faces difficulty after difficulty while trying to finalize the film. He asks his ex-girlfriend Hye-jung (Chae Seo-jin) to play the main role in his production. She is understandably surprised at his bold request but in any case, she agrees. He completes his production with success.

Cast

Main cast 
 Do Kyung-soo as Kim Hwan-dong
A film major who aspires to be a film director.
 Chae Seo-jin as Bang Hye-jung 
Hwan-dong's ex-girlfriend and quite a successful actress once.
 Lee David as Hwang In-guk
Hwan-dong's best friend and dreams to become a film producer.

Supporting cast 
 Kim Jong-soo as Professor Ma
 Kim Eui-sung as Hwan-dong's father
 Nam Gi-ae as Hwan-dong's mother
 Heo Joon-suk as Noh Seung-boo
 Unknown as Kim Han-joo

Original soundtracks

Reception 
It was reported that Be Positive became the second most watched web drama ever with 21.83 million views in just two weeks of its release, following Falling for Challenge (which was also produced by Samsung and starring D.O.'s bandmate, Xiumin), which has over 24 million views. On November 22, it was announced that the web drama surpassed 30 million views, making it the fastest web drama to reach this number of views within 18 days from its release, making it the most watched web drama of all time. As of December 30, 2016, the drama's views from Naver, Daum, Facebook and YouTube surpassed 50 million views. The web drama became the most watched in 2016 on Naver.

Awards and nominations

References

External links 

 

2016 web series debuts
South Korean drama web series
2016 web series endings
Naver TV original programming